Letters Which Never Reached Him (German: Briefe, die ihn nicht erreichten) is a 1925 German silent film directed by Frederic Zelnik and starring Albert Bassermann, Marcella Albani and Mia Pankau.

The film's sets were designed by the art directors André Andrejew and Gustav A. Knauer.

Cast
Albert Bassermann as Consul Werner Gerling 
Marcella Albani as Elena 
Mia Pankau as Bessie, her friend
Oreste Bilancia as William Charles O'Doyle, her husband 
Nils Asther as Georg von Arnim 
Bernhard Goetzke as Chü-Hi-Yin 
Tzwetta Tzatschewa as Tsu-Hsi, his daughter 
Alf Blütecher as Sir Anstrutter 
Mira Brandt as Vivian 
Wilhelm Diegelmann as Lord Dayton 
Edith Sklarz as his daughter
Nien Soen Ling as Ta-Kwan-Li, a Kuli

References

External links

Films of the Weimar Republic
Films directed by Frederic Zelnik
German silent feature films
Films based on German novels
Films set in 1900
Films set in China
Films set in the Qing dynasty
Boxer Rebellion